Gianluigi Sueva (born 1 January 2001) is a professional footballer who plays as a forward for Italian  club Olbia on loan from Cosenza. Born in Italy, he represents the Dominican Republic national team.

Club career
He was raised in Cosenza youth teams and began receiving call-ups to the senior squad in 2017.

He made his Serie B debut for Cosenza on 3 October 2020 in a game against SPAL. He substituted Angelo Corsi in the 71st minute.

On 27 January 2022, he was loaned to Potenza. On 1 August 2022, Sueva moved on loan to Olbia.

International career
On 23 February 2021, Sueva was named to the Dominican Republic national under-23 football team preliminary squad for the 2020 CONCACAF Men's Olympic Qualifying Championship. However, he did not make the final squad as he was instead called up by the Dominican Republic at senior level for two 2022 FIFA World Cup qualification – CONCACAF First Round matches against Dominica and Anguilla on 24 and 27 March 2021, respectively.

Personal life
Sueva was born in Italy to an Italian father and Dominican mother.

References

External links
 

2001 births
Living people
Footballers from Calabria
Dominican Republic footballers
Dominican Republic international footballers
Italian footballers
Dominican Republic people of Italian descent
Italian people of Dominican Republic descent
Sportspeople of Dominican Republic descent
Citizens of the Dominican Republic through descent
Association football forwards
Sportspeople from the Province of Cosenza
Cosenza Calcio players
Potenza Calcio players
Olbia Calcio 1905 players
Serie B players
Serie C players